Puschkinia peshmenii is a bulbous perennial from Turkey and Iran, producing flowers in shades of green in spring.

Description

The flowers are produced in a fairly open raceme (spike), with usually four to nine flowers, but occasionally as few as two. At flowering time the raceme is either the same length as the leaves or less. A characteristic of the genus Puschkinia is that the filaments of the stamens are fused to form a "cup" or "corona".

It has also been recorded from western Iran.

Systematics

The species was named in 2007 by Martyn Rix and Brian Mathew. The specific epithet peshmenii commemorates the Turkish botanist Hasan Peşmen (1939–1980), who discovered the species in 1974, and was later killed in a road accident. Formerly the genus Puschkinia was considered to contain only a single variable species, P. scilloides. Among other differences, P. peshmenii has green rather than blue flowers, which open when the leaves are well developed rather than when they have only just emerged, consistent with its flowering some weeks later when both species are grown together in cultivation.

Cultivation

The species is rare in cultivation, but has been grown since the mid-1970s in a bulb frame in the south of England, where it has persisted but increased only very slowly.

References

External links
  – images

Scilloideae
Flora of Turkey
Flora of Iran
Plants described in 2007